Dinawari may refer to the following:
 Abū Ḥanīfa Dinawarī, a 9th-century Iranian polymath
 Ibn Qutayba Dinawari, a 9th-century Islamic scholar
 Mumshad Dinawari, a sufi
 Abū Muḥammad Dinawarī, a 9th-century Hafiz of Qur'an and a Hadith scholar